Tsing Yi Fishermen Village and St. Paul's Village are two adjacent villages on Tsing Yi island, in Kwai Tsing District, Hong Kong.

Administration
Fishermen's Village and St. Paul's Village collectively form one of the villages represented within the Tsing Yi Rural Committee.

History
Tsing Yi Fishermen Village was completed in 1965 to provide residence to fishermen's families relocated from Tsuen Wan. It was built on a slope, originally directly facing the Tsing Yi Typhoon Shelter. It was established by a donation of the Cooperative for American Relief Everywhere.

St. Paul's Village, also a fishermen village, was established in 1973.

See also
 Mun Tsai Tong
 Fishermen villages in Hong Kong

References

External links
 Delineation of area of existing village Tsing Yi Fishermen and St. Paul's Village (Tsing Yi) for election of resident representative (2019 to 2022)

Villages in Kwai Tsing District, Hong Kong
Tsing Yi